Love Piece is Ai Otsuka's fourth album. It was released in two formats: CD Only and CD + DVD.
The first press of the CD+DVD version includes a special music video of the song U-Boat from Otsuka's LOVE COOK album, while the first press of the CD Only version includes a 40-page original photo-book.
The first press of both versions also includes a box three times the size of a regular CD, with a coloured case in one of six colours (blue, green, black, yellow, purple or pink).

Five singles were released before the album: "Frienger", "Yumekui", "Renai Shashin", Chu-Lip", and double A-Side "Peach / Heart".

Released in formats
CD + DVD
First press edition
DVD including Bonus PV "U-Boat"
Color package（6 colors:Green,Pink,Blue,Black,Purple,Yellow）

CD only
First press edition
CD＋Special Photo Book
Color package（6 colors:Green,Pink,Blue,Black,Purple,Yellow）

Track listing

Oricon sales charts (Japan)

References
avex trax (2007), Ai Otsuka Official Web Site
Oricon Style (2007), Oricon Web Site
avex trax (2007),   Ai Otsuka Official Web Site, Confirmation of Love Piece

Ai Otsuka albums
2007 albums
Avex Group albums